John Olmsted may refer to:
 John Olmsted (naturalist), California naturalist and conservationist
 John Charles Olmsted, American landscape architect
 John W. Olmsted, American historian of early modern Europe